Chutney Mary is a fine-dining Indian restaurant in London, founded in 1990 by Ranjit Mathrani & Namita Panjabi through their restaurant company, whose current name is MW Eat. It was originally located in Kings Road, Chelsea, but relocated to St James's, London in 2015.

Chutney Mary aims to redefine the public perception of Indian cuisine by showcasing the gourmet foods from 6 to 8 different regions of India at any one time. Its philosophy is that the foods of different regions are best cooked by the chefs from that region.

Awards & Reviews

At its previous location, the restaurant received the award for Best Indian restaurant in the UK twice, awarded by the Good Curry Guide. It was also featured twice in Fay Maschler's top 20 London restaurants, and the ITV Carlton Award as London's Best Indian Restaurant.

In its new location the late AA Gill gave it the maximum of 5 Stars in his Sunday Times review with the concluding words "…if there is a better pan-Indian restaurant in London than Chutney Mary, I haven't eaten in it".

Chutney Mary received the Square Meal Lifestyle BMW Best New Restaurant Award. The citation said “…For a restaurant to reach the 25-year mark is unusual; for it to mark that anniversary by moving to a totally different part of the city is unheard of”.

Time Out Magazine rated it as No 5 of Top 50 restaurants in London with the phrase “Indian cooking as good as it gets.” In the restaurant review, Roopa Gulati gave it a 5 Star rating, saying “…Astonishing quality & wonderful service”.

The Evening Standard - London Design Hotspot stated “…The new home of Chutney Mary incorporates dazzling décor that is fitting for this sumptuous environment”

 The Tatler recommended its duck jardaloo and Goan chicken curry.

Grace Dent in the Evening Standard called the dining room "irrefutably stunning", the restaurant "capacious, candle-bedazzled, art-strewn and Bentley-visited", and inevitably expensive. She found the venison samosas "unforgettable", and the carrot and cardamon soufflé with pistachio ice cream "the stuff of dreams".

Ben McCormack in The Daily Telegraph called the new restaurant "swanky". He explains that it was the first restaurant in Britain to cover all seven of the major cuisines of India: Lucknow, Punjab, Gujarat, Parsi, Goa, Kerala, and Hyderabad. He reported that the food was enjoyable and eye-opening.

See also 

 English cuisine
 List of Indian restaurants

References

External links 
 Chutney Mary

Anglo-Indian cuisine
Indian restaurants in London